David Blunt (born 29 April 1949) is an English former professional footballer who played as an inside forward in the Football League for Bradford (Park Avenue).

References

1949 births
Living people
Footballers from Barnsley
People from Goldthorpe
English footballers
Association football forwards
Bradford (Park Avenue) A.F.C. players
Chester City F.C. players
English Football League players